Fuyajo, also known as Sleepless Town, is a Hong Kong-Japanese film co-production released in 1998 based on a novel by Hase Seishū.

Cast 
Takeshi Kaneshiro as Kenichi Ryuu
Mirai Yamamoto as Natsumi Sato
Kippei Shiina as Wu Fu-chun
Sihung Lung as Yang Weimin
Eric Tsang as Yuan Chenggui
Kathy Chow as Xiu Hong

Synopsis 
Fuyajo is about Kenichi who struggles within the gangster world in Kabukicho. He is despised by locals as being a "fake" Japanese, as he is half Taiwanese and half Japanese. He is framed for covering up for an old friend who murdered one of the bosses, then he meets that person's girlfriend Natsumi and they join as fugitives.

References

1998 films
1998 crime films
Japanese crime films
Hong Kong crime films
Films set in Japan
Films produced by Kazutoshi Wadakura
Films scored by Shigeru Umebayashi
1990s Japanese films
1990s Hong Kong films